Capital League 3 is the fourth tier of men's senior football (soccer) in Brisbane (7th tier Queensland and Level 8 within Australia). It is administered by Football Brisbane. All clubs participating in Capital League 3 must field two teams, one in first grade, and another in the reserves competition. Clubs in the NPL and Brisbane Premier League cannot field their reserves teams in this division.

History
The 1949 Brisbane soccer season was the first in which the number of entries required the formation of a fourth division. The seven teams competing in 1949 Division 4 were Shafston Rovers (undefeated Div 4 champions), Redbank, Wilston (all first grade teams), and reserves teams of Merton Rovers, Corinthians, Latrobe and Wynnum.

The fourth tier of Brisbane soccer continued to be known as Division 4 from 1949 to 1982, with reserve teams from higher division teams continuing to participate alongside first grade teams of other clubs until 1977. When the Brisbane Premier League was formed in 1983, the Tier 4 league became Division 3. An intermediate league existed at Tier 2 between 1984 and 1986 and the fourth tier became Amateur Division 2. From 1987 to 1996, Tier 4 was again known as Division 4 before reverting to Amateur Division 2 again between 1997 and 2001, then Division 3 for the 2002 season.

From 2003 to 2012, the fourth tier of Brisbane football was known as Metro League Division One, which operated below the three tops tiers: the BPL, Premier Division One and Two. The league was composed of a mix of first grade teams from some clubs, and reserve teams from other clubs in the three premier divisions. The most successful club during this period was University of Queensland FC which won four Metro League One Grand Finals in the ten seasons between 2003 and 2012.

Since being rebranded Capital League 3 in 2013 following a restructure of Football Brisbane competitions, this division has continued in its 12 team format, with 22 rounds of matches played in the regular season to decide the premiers, followed by a finals series involving the top four teams to determine the champions.

Format
The regular season consists of 22 rounds with teams playing each other twice in a home and away format, including 2 byes.

Following the regular season the top four teams on the table play in a finals series using the following format:
 First Week: Semi Final 1 – 3rd vs 4th; Semi Final 2 – 1st vs 2nd
 Second Week: Preliminary Final – Loser Semi 2 vs Winner Semi 1
 Final Week: Grand Final – Winner Semi 2 vs Winner Preliminary.

Promotion/relegation
At the end of the regular season the top two teams are promoted to Capital League 2. There is a finals series at the end of the regular season.

Clubs
The clubs for the 2019 season are shown in the table below:

References

External links
 Football Brisbane
 SportsTG Fixtures & Results

Soccer leagues in Queensland